Pittsville may refer to a location in the United States:
 Pittsville, Maryland
 Pittsville, Missouri
 Pittsville, Pennsylvania
 Pittsville, Texas
 Pittsville, Virginia
 Pittsville, Wisconsin

See also
 Pittsville School District, Wisconsin